The 1952 Michigan gubernatorial election was held on November 4, 1952. Incumbent Democrat G. Mennen Williams defeated Republican nominee Frederick M. Alger Jr. with 49.96% of the vote.

General election

Candidates
Major party candidates
G. Mennen Williams, Democratic 
Frederick M. Alger Jr., Republican

Other candidates
E. Harold Munn, Prohibition
Theos A. Grove, Socialist Labor
Howard Lerner, Socialist Workers

Results

Primaries 
The primary elections occurred on August 5, 1952.

Democratic primary

Republican primary

References

1952
Michigan
Gubernatorial
November 1952 events in the United States